Below is the list of science museums all over the world. See Science museum for definitions.

Europe

Austria
 Ars Electronica Center, Linz
 Haus der Musik (House of Music), Vienna
 Naturhistorisches Museum Wien (Natural History Museum), Vienna
 Technisches Museum Wien (Vienna Technical Museum), Vienna

Belgium
 Euro Space Center, Libin
 Hidrodoe, Herentals
 Pass, Frameries
 Royal Belgian Institute of Natural Sciences, Brussels
 Technopolis, Mechelen

Bulgaria
 National Polytechnical Museum, Sofia

Croatia
 Nikola Tesla Memorial Center, Smiljan
 Split Science Museum and Zoo, Split
 Technical Museum, Zagreb

Czech Republic
 National Technical Museum, Prague
 Techmania Science Center, Pilsen

Denmark
 Kroppedal, Copenhagen
 Natural History Museum of Denmark, Copenhagen
 Science Museums, Aarhus
 Tycho Brahe Planetarium, Copenhagen

Estonia
AHHAA, Tartu

Finland
 Arktikum, Rovaniemi
 Heureka, Vantaa
 Tietomaa, Oulu

France
 Ampère Museum, Lyon
 Cité de l'espace, Toulouse
 Cité des Sciences et de l'Industrie, Paris
 Micropolis (La Cité des Insectes), Millau
 Musée des Arts et Métiers, Paris
 Palais de la Découverte, Paris
 Vulcania, Saint-Ours-les-Roches
 Exploradôme, Vitry-sur-Seine

Germany
 Deutsches Museum, Munich
 German Hygiene Museum, Dresden
 German Museum of Technology (Berlin)
 Hermann Oberth Space Travel Museum, Feucht, Bavaria
 Mathematikum, Gießen
 Mathematisch-Physikalischer Salon, Dresden
 Museum für Kommunikation, Frankfurt
 Naturmuseum Senckenberg, Frankfurt
 Otto-Lilienthal-Museum, Anklam
 Phaeno Science Center, Wolfsburg
 Rheinisches Industriemuseum, Oberhausen, Ratingen, Solingen, Bergisch Gladbach, Engelskirchen, Euskirchen
 Sinsheim Auto & Technik Museum
 Technikmuseum Speyer
 TECHNOSEUM, Mannheim
 Spectrum – German Museum of Technology (Berlin), Berlin
 Völklinger Hütte (Völklingen Ironworks), Völklingen
 Universum Science Center, Bremen

Greece
 OTE Museum of Telecommunications, Kifisia, Athens
 Thessaloniki Science Center and Technology Museum, Thessaloniki

Hungary
 Hungarian Natural History Museum, Budapest

Monaco
 Oceanographic Museum

Ireland (Republic)

Birr Castle, County Offaly (contains Ireland's Historic Science Centre)
Blackrock Castle, Cork (observatory)
National Science Museum at Maynooth
Science Gallery, Dublin

Italy
 Città della Scienza, Naples
 Museo Civico di Storia Naturale di Milano, Milan
 Museo Nazionale Scienza e Tecnologia Leonardo da Vinci, Milan
 Museo Galileo, Florence
 University History Museum, University of Pavia, Pavia

Netherlands
 Discovery Center Continium, Kerkrade 
 Museon, The Hague
 Museum Boerhaave, Leiden
 Naturalis Biodiversity Center, Leiden
 Science Center NEMO, Amsterdam
 Teyler's Museum, Haarlem

Norway
Norwegian Museum of Science and Technology, Oslo
 Trondheim Science Museum, Trondheim
 The Science Factory, Sandnes

Poland
 Copernicus Science Centre, Warsaw

Portugal
 National Museum of Natural History and Science, Lisbon, Lisbon
 Science Museum of the University of Coimbra, Coimbra
 Visionarium, Santa Maria da Feira

Romania
 Ştefan Procopiu Science and Technology Museum, Iaşi
 "Prof.eng. Dimitrie Leonida" National Technical Museum, București

Russia
Russia has over 250 science and technology museums.
Some include:
 Kunstkamera, Saint Petersburg
 Polytechnical Museum, Moscow
 Memorial Museum of Cosmonautics, Moscow
 Memorial Museum of Kazan School of Chemistry, Kazan

Serbia
 Nikola Tesla Museum, Belgrade

Spain
 Ciutat de les Arts i les Ciències, Valencia
 CosmoCaixa Barcelona, Barcelona
 Museum of Natural Sciences, Barcelona
 Museo Nacional de Ciencias Naturales, Madrid
 Parque de las Ciencias (Granada), Granada

Sweden
 Universeum, Gothenburg
 Teknikens Hus, Luleå
 Museum of Ethnography, Stockholm
 Swedish National Museum of Science and Technology, Stockholm

Switzerland
 Microcosm, CERN, Meyrin
 Technorama, Winterthur
 Verkehrshaus der Schweiz (Swiss Museum of Transport), Lucerne

Turkey
 Feza Gürsey Science Centre, Ankara 1993
 ITU Science Center, Istanbul
 Istanbul Museum of the History of Science and Technology in Islam (İstanbul İslam Bilim ve Teknoloji Tarihi Müzesi), Istanbul
 Rahmi M. Koç Museum, Istanbul
 Silahtarağa Power Station Energy Museum, Istanbul

United Kingdom
 Armagh Planetarium, Armagh, Northern Ireland
 Army Medical Services Museum, Mytchett, Surrey
 Anaesthesia Heritage Centre, London
 At-Bristol, Bristol, England
 Benjamin Franklin House, London
 Bletchley Park, Bletchley, England
 British Dental Association Museum, London
 British Optical Association Museum, London
 British Red Cross Museum, London
 Catalyst, Cheshire, England
 Centre for Life, Newcastle upon Tyne, England
 Discovery Museum, Newcastle upon Tyne
 Dundee Science Centre, Dundee, Scotland
 Enginuity, Shropshire, England
 Fleming Museum, London
 Florence Nightingale Museum, London
 Foredown Tower Countryside Centre, Portslade
 Glasgow Science Centre, Glasgow, Scotland
 Glenside Museum, Bristol
 Herschel Museum of Astronomy, Bath
 Hunterian Museum at Royal College of Surgeons, London
 INTECH, Winchester
 Manchester Museum, Manchester
 Michael Faraday Museum, London
 Mills Observatory, Dundee, Scotland
 Museum of Bath at Work, Bath
 Museum of Science and Industry in Manchester, Manchester, England
 Museum of the History of Science, University of Oxford, Oxford, England
 National Conservation Centre, Liverpool
 National Maritime Museum, Greenwich, England
 National Space Centre, Leicester, England
 Natural History Museum, London
 Old Operating Theatre, London
 Our Dynamic Earth in Edinburgh, Scotland, focuses especially on earth science
 Porthcurno Telegraph Museum, Porthcurno, Cornwall
 REME Museum of Technology, Arborfield
 Royal Institution: Faraday Museum, London, England
 Royal London Hospital Museum and Archives, London
 Royal Pharmaceutical Society Museum, London
 Satrosphere Science Centre, Aberdeen, Scotland
 Science Museum, London, England
 Science Oxford, Oxford, England
 Shildon Locomotion Museum, Shildon, England
 Snibston Discovery Park, Coalville, Leicestershire
 Surgeons' Hall, Edinburgh, Scotland
 Techniquest, Cardiff Bay, Wales
 Thackray Museum, Leeds
 Thinktank, Birmingham, Birmingham
 Whipple Museum of the History of Science, University of Cambridge, Cambridge, England
 Woolsthorpe Manor, Woolsthorpe-by-Colsterworth
 Xplore! (formerly Techniquest Glyndŵr), Wrexham, Wales

Ukraine

New Energy, Ivano-Frankivsk, Ukraine

Latin America

Argentina
 Galileo Galilei planetarium, Parque Tres de Febrero, Palermo, Buenos Aires
 Parque Astronòmico la Punta, Universidad de La Punta, Ciudad de La Punta, San Luis, Argentina

Brazil
 Museum of Life, Rio de Janeiro
 National Museum of Brazil, Rio de Janeiro
 Museum of Science and Technology (PUCRS), Porto Alegre
 Catavento Cultural, São Paulo

Colombia
 Parque Explora, Medellin
 Maloka, Bogotá

Mexico
 Alfa Planetarium, Monterrey, Nuevo Leon
 Museo Descubre, Aguascalientes, Aguascalientes
 Museo Interactivo de Xalapa, Xalapa, Veracruz
 Universum (UNAM), México, Distrito Federal
 Museo Modelo de Ciencias e Industria, Toluca, Estado de Mexico
 Palace of the Inquisition (Museum of Mexican Medicine), Mexico City
 San Pedro y San Pablo College (Museum of Light), Mexico City

North America

Canada
(listed by province)

For all categorized science museums in Canada, see: Science museums in Canada

Alberta
 Telus Spark, Calgary
 Telus World of Science, Edmonton

British Columbia
 Beaty Biodiversity Museum, Vancouver
 H. R. MacMillan Space Centre, Vancouver
 Royal British Columbia Museum, Victoria
 Science World at Telus World of Science, Vancouver

Manitoba
 Manitoba Museum, Winnipeg

New Brunswick
 Science East, Fredericton

Nova Scotia
 Discovery Centre, Halifax

Ontario
 Canadian Museum of Nature, Ottawa
 Canada Science and Technology Museum, Ottawa
 Ontario Science Centre, Toronto
 Personal Computer Museum, Brantford
 Science North and Dynamic Earth in Sudbury
 Canada South Science City in Windsor

Saskatchewan
 Saskatchewan Science Centre, Regina

Quebec
 Cosmodome (Laval), Quebec
 Mont Mégantic Observatory, Notre-Dame-des-Bois

United States

Asia and Oceania

Australia
 Macleay Museum – Sydney University Museums, Sydney, New South Wales
 Melbourne Museum, Melbourne, Victoria
 MOD., UniSA, Adelaide, South Australia
 Powerhouse Museum, Sydney
 Queensland Museum, Brisbane, Queensland
 Questacon – The National Science and Technology Centre, Canberra, ACT
 Scienceworks Museum, Melbourne
 Scitech, Perth, Western Australia
 South Australian Museum, Adelaide

Bangladesh
 National  Museum of Science and Technology

China
 China Science and Technology Museum, Beijing
 Beijing Museum of Natural History
 Shanghai Science and Technology Museum, Pudong, Shanghai
 Sichuan Science and Technology Museum, Sichuan
 Guangdong Science Center, Guangzhou

 Insect Science Museum, Taipei
 National Museum of Marine Science and Technology, Keelung
 National Taiwan Science Education Center, Taipei
 National Museum of Natural Science, Taichung
 National Science and Technology Museum, Kaohsiung
 National Museum of Marine Biology and Aquarium, Pingtung

Hong Kong
 Health Education Exhibition and Resource Centre, Kowloon Park
 Hong Kong Museum of Medical Sciences, Mid-Levels
 Fanling Environmental Resource Centre, Fanling
 Hong Kong Science Museum, Tsim Sha Tsui
 Hong Kong Space Museum, Tsim Sha Tsui

India
 Birla Industrial & Technological Museum, Kolkata
 Birla Science Museum, Hyderabad
 Gujarat Science City, Ahmedabad
 Birla Planetarium, Chennai
 Hakim Karam Hussain Museum on History of Medicine and Sciences
 Kerala Science and Technology Museum, Thiruvananthapuram
 National Council of Science Museums (NCSM)
 National Science Centre, Delhi
 Nehru Museum of Science and Technology, Kharagpur
 Nehru Science Centre, Mumbai
 Regional Science Centre, Bhopal
 Science City Kolkata, Kolkata
 Science Park, Jaipur
 Srikrishna Science Centre, Patna
 Visvesvaraya Industrial and Technological Museum, Bangalore

Indonesia
Bandung Geological Museum, Bandung
Bogor Zoology Museum, Bogor
Jakarta Planetarium and Observatory, Taman Ismail Marzuki, Jakarta
Taman Pintar Yogyakarta, Yogyakarta

Japan
 Chiba Museum of Science and Industry
 Gifu City Science Museum, Gifu, Gifu Prefecture
 Hiroshima Children's Museum, Hiroshima
 Miraikan, Tokyo
 Nagoya City Science Museum, Nagoya
 National Museum of Nature and Science, Tokyo, Japan
 Osaka Science Museum, Osaka, Japan
 Science Museum of Map and Survey, Tsukuba City
 Yamanashi Science Museum

Malaysia
 Pusat Sains Negara (National Science Centre), Kuala Lumpur
 The Green Connection, Kota Kinabalu

New Zealand
 Exscite, Hamilton, New Zealand
 Museum of Transport and Technology, Western Springs, Auckland
 Otago Museum, Dunedin

Philippines
 The Mind Museum, Bonifacio Global City, Taguig
 National Museum of Natural History, Rizal Park, City of Manila

Singapore
 Science Centre Singapore, Jurong East

South Korea
 National Science Museum, South Korea, Daejeon
 Gwacheon National Science Museum, Gyeonggi-do
 Gwangju National Museum, Gwangju
 Ulsan Science Museum, Ulsan

Thailand
 National Science Museum, Pathum Thani

Middle East

Egypt

 Planetarium Science Center
 Agriculture Museum 
 Wadi-Hitan-Fossil-Climate-Change-Museum 
 Egyptian Geological Museum
 Alexandria Aquarium
 The Children's Civilization and Creativity Center
 Zoological and Geological Museums, Tanta University
 Hurghada Grand Aquarium 
 Museum of the Zoology Department, South Valley University 
 Kasr EL-Aini Museum, Cairo University
 Medicinal Plants Museum, Cairo University

Israel
 Bloomfield Science Museum, Jerusalem
 Israel National Museum of Science, Technology, and Space, Haifa

Africa

Ethiopia
 Ethiopia Museum of Art and Science, Addis Ababa

South Africa
 MTN Sciencentre, Cape Town

See also
 List of natural history museums
 Planetarium
 Science tourism

References

External links
 Map the World's Science Museums on Nature blogs

 
Lists of museums by subject
Science-related lists